Robert Rosner (born June 26, 1947) is an astrophysicist and founding director of the  Energy Policy Institute at the University of Chicago, where he is the William E. Wrather Distinguished Service Professor in the departments of Astronomy and Astrophysics and Physics.  He was the director of Argonne National Laboratory from 2005 to 2009. Prior to his appointment as Argonne's director, his research was focused primarily on astrophysical fluid dynamics and plasma physics problems. Rosner is a member of the Norwegian Academy of Science and Letters, and also sits on the Science and Security Board of the Bulletin of the Atomic Scientists.

References

External links
Robert Rosner bio at Argonne National Laboratory

Living people
1947 births
People from Garmisch-Partenkirchen
German emigrants to the United States
American astronomers
German astrophysicists
Members of the Norwegian Academy of Science and Letters
Harvard University alumni
Fellows of the American Physical Society